O.M. Edwards Building is located at the intersection of Plum and Solar Streets in Syracuse, New York.  It is a representative example of an early twentieth century manufacturing plant.  It was designed by Gordon Wright, and built in 1906.  The building was added to the National Register of Historic Places in 2001.

References

Industrial buildings and structures on the National Register of Historic Places in New York (state)
Industrial buildings completed in 1906
Buildings and structures in Syracuse, New York
National Register of Historic Places in Syracuse, New York
1906 establishments in New York (state)